Salvador Moreno Manzano or Salvador Moreno (1916-1999) born  in  Orizaba, (Veracruz), was a composer, art historian and Mexican painter closely linked to Catalonia.

Biography 
A disciple of Alejandro Mestizo, Salvador Moreno Manzano moved to Barcelona attracted by the reputation of pedagogue and composer David Segovia, of whom he became an outstanding student. He was also a student of Cristòfor Taltabull.

His opera Severino (1961), with a libretto by Joao Cabral de Melo Neto, marked the debut of tenor Placido Domingo at the Liceu Theater in Barcelona (1966). His songs with Nahuatl texts by José Mª Bonilla have often been included in her recitals by soprano Victoria de los Ángeles. These were also recorded by soprano María Bonilla after having sung them in recitals accompanied at the piano by Salvador Moreno himself. Soprano Margarita Gonzalez Ontiveros also sung his bel canto music. He also composed music for several poems by Rafael Santos Torroella.

As an art historian Moreno published works on Catalan artists who lived and worked in Mexico, such as the romantic painters Pelegrí Clavé (1966) and Antonio Fabrés (1977), the latter brought to Mexico by Porfirio Díaz, and about the sculptor Manuel Vilar (1969), these works have been  published by the National Autonomous University of Mexico, for which Moreno worked as a special researcher in aesthetics.

Moreno maintained a long friendship with intellectuals and painters of the Spanish republican exile in Mexico, like Luis Cernuda, Rosa Chacel, Juan Gil-Albert, Ramón Gaya, Soledad Martínez and Tomás Segovia, among others. Much of his correspondence with these intellectuals has been published by Pre-Texts.

In 1983, Moreno became a member of the Royal Catalan Academy of Fine Arts of San Jorge, Barcelona.

He was also responsible for the  official recognition of composer Jaime Nunó, author of the music of the Mexican National Anthem, who was born in San Juan de las Abadesas in Catalonia.

As a painter, his subtle still lifes are influenced by the work of both his artist friends Pedro Castillo and Ramón Gaya.

References 

Content in this edit is translated from the existing Spanish Wikipedia article at :es:Salvador Moreno Manzano; see its history for attribution.

Mexican composers
Mexican art historians
20th-century Mexican painters
Mexican male painters
1916 births
1999 deaths
20th-century Mexican male artists